Doris P. Miner (born March 13, 1936) is an American former politician. She served in the South Dakota House of Representatives from 1977 to 1978 and in the Senate from 1979 to 1992.

References

1936 births
Living people
People from Gregory County, South Dakota
Businesspeople from South Dakota
Ranchers from South Dakota
Women state legislators in South Dakota
Democratic Party members of the South Dakota House of Representatives
Democratic Party South Dakota state senators
20th-century American politicians
20th-century American women politicians
21st-century American women